"" ("Great Indonesia") is the national anthem of Indonesia. It has been the national anthem since the Proclamation of Indonesian Independence on 17 August 1945. The song was introduced by its composer, Wage Rudolf Supratman, on 28 October 1928 during the Youth Pledge in Jakarta. The song marked the birth of the all-archipelago nationalist movement in Indonesia that supported the idea of one single "Indonesia" as successor to the Dutch East Indies, rather than split into several colonies. The first newspaper to openly publish the musical notation and lyrics of "Indonesia Raya" — an act of defiance towards the Dutch authorities — was the Chinese Indonesian weekly Sin Po (newspaper).

The first stanza of "Indonesia Raya" was chosen as the national anthem when Indonesia proclaimed its independence on 17 August 1945. Jozef Cleber, a Dutch composer, created an arrangement of the tune for philharmonic orchestra in on August 17, 1950 AD when the island of Sumatra became an integral part of the Republic of Indonesia. This arrangement is widely used.

"Indonesia Raya" is played in flag raising ceremonies in schools across Indonesia every Monday. The flag is raised in a solemn and timed motion so that it reaches the top of the flagpole as the anthem ends. The main flag raising ceremony is held annually on 17 August to commemorate Independence day. The ceremony is led by the President of Indonesia and is usually held in Merdeka Palace.

During the rendition or singing of the national anthem, all present should stand, face toward the music, and pay respect. Members of the Armed Forces, and other persons in uniform (e.g. secondary school students) must render the military salute.

History

Indonesian Youth Congress

When he lived in Jakarta, Soepratman read an essay from Timbul magazine. The essay author challenged Indonesian music experts to compose a future Indonesian national anthem. Soepratman – who was also a musician – felt challenged, and started composing. In 1924, the song was completed during his time in Bandung and entitled "Indonesia".

In 1928, youths from across Indonesia held the first Indonesian Youth Congress, an official meeting to push for the independence of the nation. Upon hearing about the efforts, young reporter Wage Rudolf Soepratman contacted the organizers of Congress with the intention of reporting the story, but they requested that he not publish the story from fear of Dutch colonial authorities. The organizers wanted to avoid suspicion so that the Dutch would not ban the event. Supratman promised them this,  and the organizers allowed him free access to the event. Supratman was inspired by the meetings and intended to play the song for the conference. After receiving encouragement from the conference leader Sugondo Djojopuspito, Soepratman played the song on the violin, hoping that it would someday become their national anthem. Soepratman first performed Indonesia on the violin on 28 October 1928 during the Second Indonesian Youth Congress. He kept the script to himself because he felt that it was not the appropriate time to announce it.

Distribution 
Following the Second Youth Congress, the text of Indonesia was distributed by many political and student organisations. The press also played a key role in the publication of the song. On 7 November 1928, the Soeloeh Ra'jat Indonesia daily published the words to the song. This was followed by the Sin Po Chinese weekly on 10 November. In 1929, Wage Rudolf Supratman changed the title of his song to "Indonesia Raya" and appended the phrase "national anthem of Indonesia" below it, but the text of the song did not change. Soepratman personally printed and distributed copies of the song with its new title through pamphlets. All one thousand copies of the manuscript were sold within a short amount of time to his friends and family.

That same year, the prominent Indonesian businessman and record executive Tio Tek Hong contacted Supratman; the two agreed to issue the first records of the anthem, with Supratman retaining copyright over it. The new records were extremely popular, but in 1930 the Dutch colonial authorities placed a ban on the song and confiscated all remaining unsold records.

A businessman friend of his, Yo Kim Tjan, also expressed interest in recording "Indonesia Raya". With Soepratman's consent, Yo created a copy of the song on a gramophone record overseas to obtain the best sound quality with the intention of bringing the copy back to Indonesia. However, before Yo was able to do so, Dutch colonial authorities had imposed a ban on the song. Yo was unable to bring the original back but was able to bring home a copy. According to Yo, Soepratman had also given him the rights to sell record copies of "Indonesia Raya" through his store Toko Populair.

Orchestration
Initially, there had been no orchestral version of the anthem. Thus in 1950, The Indonesian Government made an appeal to Jozef Cleber to compose a symphonic rendition of "Indonesia Raya".

Cleber at the time had been among the 46 people of the Cosmopolitan Orchestra, under direction of Yvon Baarspul, sent by the Netherlands government to help the Indonesian government for its own music development in Jakarta. "Jos" Cleber was an experienced arranger not only of western songs but also for Indonesian pop songs such as Di Bawah Sinar Bulan Purnama and Rangkaian Melati. 
 
Indonesia Raya was recorded under Cleber's direction on a newly acquired Phillips recorder in early 1951 with musicians from all three radio orchestras of RRI Jakarta and the tape was played for President Sukarno's approval. Sukarno found the performance too frilly and asked for something like the red and white Indonesian flag, and in the grave tempo of the Dutch anthem Wilhelmus. Cleber considered this last impossible, though he discerned some of the character of the Marseillaise in the tune and made a second arrangement marked maestoso con bravura as a compromise. This met Sukarno's approval, but he requested that the climax be prepared by a grazioso ("Liefelijk") section. This final version of the anthem remained in use for 47 years.
 
The arrangement starts with a Tutti of strings and trumpets (in Verse A) that represents a brave and an elegant sound, and in the middle of the song (in Verse B) is played smoothly by strings, and finally (in Verse C) comes another Tutti of strings and trumpets, together with the timpani and cymbals, giving it a brave sound fitting for a national anthem that was respected by the people.

Ownership
In 1951, ownership of the copyright to "Indonesia Raya" came into question. President Sukarno ordered a search for the rightful heir to Soepratman. By law, Supratman was the copyright holder of "Indonesia Raya" as its composer. After Soepratman's death in 1938, ownership of the rights to his works fell upon the designated heirs, his four surviving sisters. However, because "Indonesia Raya" was officially adopted as the national anthem of Indonesia on 17 August 1945, the work became the property of the state. In addition, the name of "Wage Rudolf Supratman" must be listed as its creator.

As a national anthem, copies of "Indonesia Raya" cannot be circulated as merchandise to be sold. Consequently, the government had the obligation to obtain all the rights to distribute the song, including the original recording, from Yo Kim Tjan. In 1958, the government obtained the sole right to "Indonesia Raya" from Soepratman's family. The following year, Yo handed the original record of the song to the Indonesian government. With the recommendation of the Department of Education, the government also rewarded Soepratman's sisters with 250,000 Indonesian rupiah each on 31 May 1960.

Legal basis 
As stipulated by Chapter XV, Article 36B of the Constitution of the Republic of Indonesia, Indonesia Raya is the national anthem of Indonesia. Furthermore, pursuant to 1958 State Gazette no. 44, only the first stanza of Indonesia Raya is to serve the function of a national anthem.

Lyrics
There is no official translation of "Indonesia Raya" into other languages. On 28 October 1953, on the 25th anniversary of the anthem, the Harian Umum daily published their own English, German, and Dutch translations of the song. A bulletin released by the Ministry of Information used these translations. Currently, however, the translations are no longer published.

See also 

 Bangun Pemudi-Pemuda

Notes

References

External links

 Official version of the National anthem of Indonesia
 Download National Anthem of Indonesia 2017 Rendition by GBN National Youth Orchestra & Choir, .mp3 or .wav 
 Download Partiture / Musical Notation Sheet of INDONESIA RAYA 2017 Rendition, .pdf
 Streaming audio, lyrics and information for and about 'Indonesia Raya'
 Music Video – An Amazing HD Version of Indonesian National Anthem, hosted on YouTube
 Indonesia Raya 1945 – A World War II era reel that shows the full length song, also hosted on YouTube
 Indonesia Raya during the Commemoration of the Anniversary of the Indonesian Armed Forces

National anthems
National symbols of Indonesia
Asian anthems
Indonesian patriotic songs
Articles containing video clips
National anthem compositions in G major